The Croatia Boat Show (CBS) is a boat show, held annually in the city of Split, Croatia, typically during the month of April. The exhibition is organised by Croatian business entrepreneur Vicenco Blagaić, and takes place at the City harbour of the Port of Split.

See also 

 List of sailboat designers and manufacturers
 Adriatic Boat Show

References

External links 
 Croatia Boat Show  

Boat shows
Events in Split, Croatia
Trade fairs in Croatia
Recurring events established in 1998
Annual events in Croatia
Spring (season) events in Croatia
Boat show